Numic is a branch of the Uto-Aztecan language family. It includes seven languages spoken by Native American peoples traditionally living in the Great Basin, Colorado River basin, Snake River basin, and southern Great Plains. The word Numic comes from the cognate word in all Numic languages for "person."

Classification 

These languages are classified in three groups:

 Central Numic languages
 Comanche
 Timbisha (a dialect chain with main regional varieties being Western, Central, and Eastern)
 Shoshoni (a dialect chain with main regional varieties being Western, Gosiute, Northern, and Eastern)
 Southern Numic languages
 Kawaiisu
 Colorado River (a dialect chain with main regional varieties being Chemehuevi, Southern Paiute, and Ute)
 Western Numic languages
 Mono (two main dialects:  Eastern and Western)
 Northern Paiute (a dialect chain with main regional varieties being Southern Nevada, Northern Nevada, Oregon, and Bannock)

Apart from Comanche, each of these groups contains one language spoken in a small area in the southern Sierra Nevada and valleys to the east (Mono, Timbisha, and Kawaiisu), and one language spoken in a much larger area extending to the north and east (Northern Paiute, Shoshoni, and Colorado River).  Some linguists have taken this pattern as an indication that Numic speaking peoples expanded quite recently from a small core, perhaps near the Owens Valley, into their current range. This view is supported by lexicostatistical studies. Fowler's reconstruction of Proto-Numic ethnobiology also points to the region of the southern Sierra Nevada as the homeland of Proto-Numic approximately two millennia ago.  Recent mitochondrial DNA studies have supported this linguistic hypothesis. The anthropologist Peter N. Jones thinks this evidence to be of a circumstantial nature, but this is a distinctly minority opinion among specialists in Numic.  David Shaul has proposed that the Southern Numic languages spread eastward long before the Central and Western Numic languages expanded into the Great Basin.

Bands of eastern Shoshoni split off from the main Shoshoni body in the very late 17th or very early 18th century and moved southeastward onto the Great Plains.  Changes in their Shoshoni dialect eventually produced Comanche.  The Comanche language and the Shoshoni language are quite similar although certain low-level consonant changes in Comanche have inhibited mutual intelligibility.

Recent lexical and grammatical diffusion studies in Western Numic have shown that while there are clear linguistic changes that separate Northern Paiute as a distinct linguistic variety, there are no unique linguistic changes that mark Mono as a distinct linguistic variety.

Major sound changes 
The sound system of Numic is set forth in the following tables.

Vowels
Proto-Numic had an inventory of five vowels.

Consonants
Proto-Numic had the following consonant inventory:

Between vowels short consonants were lenited.

Major Central Numic consonant changes
The major difference between Proto-Central Numic and Proto-Numic was the phonemic split of Proto-Numic geminate consonants into geminate consonants and preaspirated consonants.  The conditioning factors involve stress shifts and are complex.  The preaspirated consonants surfaced as voiceless fricatives, often preceded by a voiceless vowel.

This change postdates the earliest record of Comanche from 1786, but precedes the 20th century. Geminated stops in Comanche have also become phonetically preaspirated.

Major Southern Numic consonant changes
Proto-Southern Numic preserved the Proto-Numic consonant system fairly intact, but the individual languages have undergone several changes.

Modern Kawaiisu has reanalyzed the nasal-stop clusters as voiced stops, although older recordings preserve some of the clusters.  Geminated stops and affricates are voiceless and non-geminated stops and affricates are voiced fricatives.  The velar nasals have fallen together with the alveolar nasals.

The dialects of Colorado River east of Chemehuevi have lost .  The dialects east of Kaibab have collapsed the nasal-stop clusters with the geminated stops and affricate.

Major Western Numic consonant changes
Proto-Western Numic changed the nasal-stop clusters of Proto-Numic into voiced geminate stops.  In Mono and all dialects of Northern Paiute except Southern Nevada, these voiced geminate stops have become voiceless.

Sample Numic cognate sets
The following table shows some sample Numic cognate sets that illustrate the above changes.  Forms in the daughter languages are written in a broad phonetic transcription rather than a phonemic transcription that sometimes masks the differences between the forms.  Italicized vowels and sonorants are voiceless.

References 

 
Northern Uto-Aztecan languages
Indigenous languages of California
Indigenous languages of the North American Great Basin
Indigenous languages of the North American Plains
Indigenous languages of the North American Plateau
Indigenous languages of the North American Southwest
Agglutinative languages
Uto-Aztecan languages
Indigenous languages of North America